Lili is a feminine given name. Notable people with the name include: 

 Lilí Álvarez (1905–1998), Spanish athlete, author, and journalist
 Lili Bosse, mayor of Beverly Hills, California
 Lili Boulanger (1893–1918), French composer
 Lili Chookasian (born 1921), American operatic contralto
 Lili Damita (1904–1994), French actress
 Lili Elbe (1882–1931), one of the first identifiable recipients of male-to-female sex reassignment surgery, possibly intersex
 Lili Haydn (born 1975), Canadian violinist, vocalist, composer, guitarist, and actress
 Lili Ivanova (born 1939), Bulgarian singer
 Lili Kraus (1903–1986), Hungarian-born British pianist
 Li Lili (1915–2005), Chinese actress
 Lili Massaferro (1926–2001), Argentine actress and militant
 Lilibet "Lili" Mountbatten-Windsor (born 2021), daughter of Prince Harry, Duke of Sussex, and Meghan, Duchess of Sussex
 Lili Novy (1885–1958), Slovenian poet and translator of poetry
 Lili Päivärinta (born 1966), Swedish singer and artist
 Lili Qiu (born 1975), Chinese computer scientist
 Lili Reinhart (born 1996), American actress
 LiLi Roquelin, French-born American trip-hop singer-songwriter and pianist
 Lili Simmons, (born 1993), American actress
 Lili St. Cyr (1918–1999), American burlesque stripper
 Lili Tampi (born 1970), Indonesian retired badminton player
 Lili Taylor (born 1967), American actress

See also
Lily (name)
Lilly (given name)
Lillie (name)

Feminine given names